William DuBois may refer to:

 William DuBois (architect) (1879–1953), American architect and politician based in Cheyenne, Wyoming
 William Dubois (usher) (1841–1910), Chief Usher of the White House, 1881–1902
 William DuBois (writer) (1903–1997), American playwright, novelist, and editor of The New York Times Book Review
 William Edward Burghardt Du Bois (1868–1963), American sociologist, historian, and civil rights activist
 William H. Dubois (1835–1907), Vermont businessman and political figure
 William Pène du Bois (1916–1993), French-American author and illustrator